is a gravity dam on the Tadami River,  east of Tadami in Fukushima Prefecture, Japan. Surveys for the dam were carried out in 1958, construction began in 1959 and the dam was complete in 1961. The primary purpose of the dam is hydroelectric power generation and it supports a 92 MW power station consisting of 2 x 46 MW Kaplan turbines. The dam's spillway is controlled by four sluice gates and has a  discharge capacity.

See also

Honna Dam – located downstream
Tadami Dam – located upstream

References

Dams in Fukushima Prefecture
Hydroelectric power stations in Japan
Dams completed in 1961
Dams on the Tadami River
Energy infrastructure completed in 1961
1961 establishments in Japan
Gravity dams